Conflation occurs when the identities of two or more individuals, concepts, or places, sharing some characteristics of one another, become confused until there seems to be only a single identity

Conflation may also refer to:
 Conflation of Readings, term used in textual criticism, for combined readings from two manuscripts with different textual variants
 In cartography, conflation refers to the act of combining two distinct maps into one new map. It is similar to the practice of image mosaicking.  It is usually carried out by registration of an overlapping area. Conflation for digital maps refers to the process of associating real world coordinates to digital ones and it is named Map Matching
 In physics, conflation refers to two distinct universes being combined and fused into one new universe.
 In linguistics, conflation is a synonym for the process of stemming